Sadou is an unincorporated community in Lafayette Parish, Louisiana, United States.

The community is located near the intersection of US Hwy 90  and LA Hwy 724.

References

Unincorporated communities in Louisiana
Unincorporated communities in Lafayette Parish, Louisiana
Acadiana